Böðvar Guðmundsson is an Icelandic writer born 9 January 1939; he grew up in Borgarfjörður, specifically Kirkjuból í Hvítársíðu. He is known for plays, poetry, novels, and children's books. He is said to be best known for the novels Híbýli vindanna (1995; Where the Winds Dwell) and Lífsins tré (1996; Tree of Life) He has done numerous translations of writers such as Roald Dahl and Heinrich Böll. He was a teacher and guest lecturer at the University of Bergen in the 1980s. He was at one time married to the Icelandic literary scholar Helga Kress. He lives in Denmark and is still writing.

Böðvar's most recent novels are the novel Enn er morgunn ([Akranes]: Uppheimar, 2009; ; 9789979659730), his fourth, which is about Nazi sympathisers in Iceland around the Second World War and which led to controversy when Böðvar's ex-wife Helga demanded its recall, reading it as a personal attack on the reputation of her parents Bruno Kress and Kristína Thoroddsen; and Töfrahöllin ([Akranes]: Uppheimar, 2012; ; 9935432742), his fifth.

See also 

 List of Icelandic writers
 Icelandic literature

References

External links
Iceland literature site
His own statements, from the same site

Bodvar Gudmundsson
Academic staff of the University of Bergen
1939 births
Living people